The 1979–80 season was Burnley's fourth consecutive season in the second tier of English football. They were initially managed by Harry Potts until October 1979, when Brian Miller took charge of the club.

Appearances and goals

|}

Matches

Football League Division Two
Key

In Result column, Burnley's score shown first
H = Home match
A = Away match

pen. = Penalty kick
o.g. = Own goal

Results

Final league position

FA Cup

League Cup

Anglo-Scottish Cup

References

Burnley F.C. seasons
Burnley